Billy Ray Minor Jr (born June 27, 1970) is a former American Football wide receiver. He played in the National Football League for Philadelphia Eagles and also in the Arena Football League for the Dallas Texans. He played college football at East Texas State University (now Texas A&M University-Commerce) where he was a 4-year letterman, 2 time All Lone Star Conference performer, Conference Champion, member of 2 National quarter-finalist teams, and finished his career as a top 10 receiver in program history in receptions and receiving yards.

Early life
Minor was born on the Fort Riley military base. His family moved early in his life to the Northeast Texas city of Paris, Texas. He played high school football under Allen Wilson at Paris High School where he was 3rd team All-State, 1st team all district, 1st team all Red River Valley in football and also all state in Track.

College career
Despite a stellar high school career, Minor was only shown marginal interest by major college programs such as Louisiana Tech University and Tulsa University. Minor was planning to join the United States Military after high school; however, his high school track coach talked to coaches at East Texas State in Commerce, Texas. Minor was invited to try out for the East Texas State team walked on to the Lion football team and was awarded a football scholarship before the 1988 season.

1988-1989
Minor played as a true freshman during the 1988 season for East Texas, where he caught 3 passes for 48 yards. In that year, the Lions had their first winning season under Coach Eddie Vowell and finished 8-3 and were ranked as high as #2 in the nation, before losing their final two games. Minor missed the 1989 season due to a knee injury.

1990 season
Minor rehabbed his injury and played 12 games during the 1990 season. During the regular season, he finished 3rd on the team in receiving as he caught 18 passes for 416 yards and 5 touchdowns. The Lions won the 1990 Lone Star Conference Championship and qualified for the 1990 NCAA Division II playoffs. The Lions defeated Grand Valley State in the first round and finished as National Quarterfinalists, bowing out to Pittsburg State, finishing 7th in the country.

1991 season
Minor earned All-Lone Star Conference Honorable Mention honors for his 1991 season performance. He caught 25 passes for 571 yards and 4 touchdowns, in the regular season. He caught the game winning touchdown against Texas A&M-Kingsville that gave the Lions their first road win over the powerful Javelinas since 1982. The Lions once again qualified for NCAA playoffs and finished as National quarterfinalists again, finishing with a number 19 ranking.

1992 season
In 1992, Minor was named team captain and had his best statistical season as a Lion as he caught 40 passes for 731 yards and 5 touchdowns. He was named First-team All-Lone Star Conference and helped led the Lions to an 8–3 record and a # 14 final ranking. His final college career numbers were 98 receptions for 1,995 yards and 14 touchdowns. While attending ETSU, Minor studied accounting and was a member of the Alpha Phi Alpha fraternity.

Professional career

Philadelphia Eagles
Minor was undrafted in the 1993 NFL draft but was signed as an undrafted free agent by the Philadelphia Eagles. He was joined in Philadelphia by Lion teammate Anthony Brooks. Minor had impressed his position coaches but an injury derailed his hopes to make the final roster and he was released before the preseason games started.

Arena Football League
After being released by the Eagles, Minor was signed by the Dallas Texans of the Arena Football League. The Texans were coached by former East Texas State quarterback Mike Trigg. He played the 1993 Arena League season with the Texans and after the season, decided to leave professional football.

Personal life
Minor now works in the healthcare industry and lives in Sherman, Texas with his wife Samantha and has 5 children. He also contributes as a writer to The Lion Wire, an A&M-Commerce fan site blog, and coaches youth sports in Sherman. In January of 2023, The A&M-Commerce Athletic Department announced that Minor would be inducted into the Texas A&M University-Commerce Athletic Hall of Fame Class of 2023.

References

1970 births
Living people
People from Paris, Texas
Texas A&M–Commerce Lions football players
Philadelphia Eagles players
Players of American football from Texas